Caimo is an Italian surname. Notable people with the surname include:

Angelo Caimo (1914–1998), Italian footballer
Gioseppe Caimo ( 1545–1584), Italian Renaissance composer and organist

Italian-language surnames